Landingham may refer to:

 Marian Van Landingham (born 1937), American community leader, politician and artist
 Mrs. Landingham, fictional Secretary to the President of the United States in the first two seasons of The West Wing
 J. C. Van Landingham (–1996), American stock car racing driver
 William Van Landingham (born 1970), former pitcher in Major League Baseball